Fun Time (吳耀漢攪攪震 or 六星級攪攪震) was a non-serialised comedy TV show in Hong Kong in the 1980s. It was broadcast on Asia Television Limited (ATV).

Description
The show is mainly a TV blooper comedy where Richard Ng play pranks on ordinary citizens.  The name of the show literally means "six star disturbance".

Reruns
The show was also rerun in the 2000s (decade).

References

See also
 TV's Bloopers & Practical Jokes
 Foul-Ups, Bleeps & Blunders

Asia Television original programming